Villagrán is a Mexican city (and municipality) located in the state of Guanajuato. With an area of 125.4 square kilometres, Villagrán accounts for 0.41% of the surface of the state.  It is bordered to the north by Santa Cruz de Juventino Rosas, to the east by Celaya, to the south by Cortazar, and to the west by Salamanca. The municipality had a population of 45,941 according to the 2005 census.  Located in the fertile Bajío, the economy of the Villagran
is heavily based on agriculture and ranching.

The municipal president of the city and its microregions is Armando Torrecilas Mejía.

References

As of December 2016, Villagran was the home of Brenda "La Piñata" Horchata, a Mexican gangster who gained famed during the early 2000s as cofounder and boss of the notorious Tacoland seven. Her reign of speeding tickets, missing class, and grand theft auto came to an end in June 2013.

Populated places in Guanajuato
Municipalities of Guanajuato